The United States Submarine Veterans of World War II is a congressionally chartered veterans organization that was established to "perpetuate the memory of those shipmates who gave their lives in submarine warfare"  during World War II.

Purpose
In 1956 a group of Plankowners formulated and discussed thoroughly the purpose of a motto of the newly formed organization.

1956 version:  "The purpose of this organization is to perpetuate the memory of those shipmates who voluntarily gave their lives in submarine warfare; to further promote and keep alive the spirit and unity that existed among submarine crewmen during WW II; to promote sociability, general welfare and good fellowship among its members; and pledge loyalty and patriotism to the United States government."

In 1970 this 'purpose of' or motto was changed to read:  "To perpetuate the memory of those shipmates who gave their lives in submarine warfare; to further promote and keep alive the spirit and unity that existed among submarine crewmen during WW II; to promote sociability, general welfare and good fellowship among its members; and pledge loyalty and patriotism to the United States government."

History

Formation
The organization got its start on July 4, 1955  when Bud Trimble conceived the idea after futilely searching through veterans' magazines for ten years for a submarine reunion announcement.  Being unsuccessful in this endeavor Trimble called his old shipmate Ed Branin and they discussed having a reunion which would include the entire World War II Submarine Service of enlisted men and officers.  A two-line reunion announcement was placed in the American Legion magazine Reunions column.  Also, a write-up in Walter Winchell's column in the Bethlehem Times-Leader read as follows:

First National Convention
The First National Convention (Reunion) was held at the Ambassador Hotel in Atlantic City, New Jersey on September 23–25, 1955.  Sixty or so attendees were senior officers and enlisted men still on active duty as well as many retirees and former mess cooks and deck hands.  It was said they had to invite the waiters and bartenders to sit down to make the crowd look bigger.  Out of the 60 or so who registered, only 30 stuck out the reunion.  There were 21 "Plank Owners" who attended the first National Convention.  At this reunion Hugh Trimble was appointed as the 1955 National President (Pro-tem).  Ed Branin was appointed as the 1956 National President and Hugh Trimble was appointed Secretary-Treasurer and plans were formulated by the attendees to meet the following year, September 28–30, at the same location.  The first National Convention was considered a total success.

Events of 1956
Three major events took place in 1956.  First was the incorporation of the organization; the second was the Second Annual Convention (Reunion); and third the publication of its very first news bulletin called the Twin Dolphins, published in December 1956.  The Twin Dolphins listed the entire constitution and By-laws, a complete list of the charter members, news briefs, and a condensed version of the second (1956) reunion.

The Second Annual Convention (Reunion) was again held in Atlantic City, New Jersey from September 28–30, 1956.  Submarine veterans came from all parts of the country, representing every boat active during World War II.  As expected, New England and the Eastern Seaboard had the greatest number in attendance.  Many men brought their wives.  The group gathered for an informal cocktail party and to meet the officers and founders of the organization.  A supper was held consisting of steamed clams, corn on the cob, hamburgers, salads, and plenty of beer, socializing long into the night.  The next morning the group reassembled for the annual business meeting and election of officers for the new year.  A very solemn memorial service was held on the beach front, with Commander Charles Adams, Chaplain, conducting services.  After special dedications were made for each individual lost boat, the services were ended with the dropping of a large floral wreath from a plane off the coast.  The annual banquet was a gala affair with over 200 in attendance.

Although only in its second year of existence, several states had already organized and District Commanders were appointed to the National Executive Board.  Membership had increased 100% in less than one year.  If a state did not have a chapter aspiring individuals could give their name to the National President and it would be submitted to the Executive Board for approval.  It was in this fashion that the organization experienced rapid growth.

Incorporation
The organization was incorporated under the laws of the State of New Jersey on February 15, 1956.  The certificate of incorporation was recorded at Trenton, New Jersey.

Federal Charter
At the 1960 San Diego National Convention the first application was made for a Federal Charter.  21 years later after several attempts a Federal Charter was granted on November 20, 1981 during the Ronald Reagan administration under Title 36 of the United States Code, Chapter 2207.

World War II Submarine Combat Patrol Insignia
On February 19, 1943 the U.S. Navy Department Permanent Naval Uniform Board discussed a directive from Admiral Ernest King for the design of a Submarine Combat Patrol insignia for crew members of submarines participating in successful combat war patrols.  On March 26, 1943 Acting Secretary of the Navy James Forrestal approved the insignia and the Submarine Combat Patrol Insignia was established.  Regulations provided for award of the insignia to officers and men assigned to submarine duty who completed (since December 7, 1941) one or more patrols during which the submarine sank or assisted in sinking at least one enemy vessel or accomplished a combat mission of comparable importance.

The Submarine Combat Patrol insignia could be awarded to crewmen prior to their designation of Qualified in Submarines.  Full pride in the insignia was not realized until it was worn with dolphins.  However, the Commanding Officer of a submarine which conducted a successful war patrol for purposes of awarding the insignia was key in the chain of command for the awarding authority.  As such, he could recommend withholding the award of the insignia by advising the appropriate force or type Commander concerning any officer or enlisted man who he felt was 1) incapable of obtaining the designation of Qualified in Submarines or 2) who failed to display proper efforts to become qualified.  If such officer or enlisted man failed to Qualify in Submarines or show proper effort, the force or type Commander would, after full consideration of the attending circumstances, withhold the award of the Submarine Combat Patrol insignia.

Digger hat
The Australian Digger hat is the official headwear of the organization  and is worn by members at all official functions.  The hats are dark blue in color with a gold band and gold trim on the edges of the brim, with a white plume feather.  The hat remains on when at colors and the wearer salutes.  When inside a building, the hat is always removed.  An exception is the hat is always worn at indoor meetings, it is never removed for prayers, memorial services, or for burials, and is worn during playing of the National Anthem.

The hat is credited to Ernst T. Rosing who upon conclusion of the war, brought home an Australian Digger hat.  He wore this hat to all meetings and was soon nicknamed Digger by his brother shipmates.  During World War II numerous U.S. submarines were operated from Australia from the ports of Fremantle and Brisbane.

Vest
Vests were never officially adopted as part of the national uniform such as the Digger hats were.  However, the majority of the membership and their wives proudly wear a vest to all official events and gatherings.  The vests come in an array of colors, but most notably blue with gold trim with the National Organization Insignia on the back, usually with the name of the local chapter, and the names and hull numbers of the submarines served upon.  The front of the vests are usually adorned with dolphins, the Submarine Combat Patrol insignia, ribbons, and various unit patches related to the submarines and commands served at.

Legacy

World War II
The United States Navy Submarine Service lost 52 submarines, 374 officers and 3,131 enlisted men during World War II.  These personnel losses represented 16% of the officer and 13% of the enlisted operational personnel. This loss rate was the highest among men and ships of any U.S. Navy unit.

Less than two percent of American sailors served in submarines, yet that small percentage of men and their boats sank 214  Japanese warships.  This included 1 battleship, 4 large aircraft carriers, 4 small aircraft carriers, 3 heavy cruisers, 8 light cruisers, 43 destroyers, 23 large submarines and 1,178  merchant ships of more than 500 tons.

In all, U.S. submarines sank more than 55 percent of all Japanese ships sunk.  More than surface ships, Navy air and the U.S. Army Air Corps combined.

Fleet Admiral Chester W. Nimitz summarized their efforts after the war by writing:

Status
With members of the organization gradually passing away, many of the organizations State Chapters have closed.  Due to this inevitable occurrence many members have chosen to become members and/or joint members with their local United States Submarine Veterans Inc. (USSVI) base to carry on their legacy.

Submarine Memorials

The organization was responsible for the construction and placement of numerous memorials and plaques which honored their fallen comrades and the submarines they served on.

52 Boats Memorial, 2010
Admiral Nimitz Memorial Plaque
Boys Town Memorial, 1962
Captain Cromwell Memorial, 1973
Church Window Memorial, 1975
Fremantle Submarine Memorial, 1967
 Memorial
Hawaii Memorial Plaque, 1976
Howard W. Gilmore Memorial, 1975
John P. Holland Memorial, 1975
K-13 Submarine Memorial
Lockwood Memorial, 1968
Los Angeles Submarine Memorial, 1977
Louisiana Submarine Memorial
Massachusetts Memorial for Individuals, 1968
New Zealand Memorial
Pearl Harbor Submarine Memorial, 1960
San Diego Memorial, 1976
Submarine Memorial, Annapolis, Maryland, 1976
Submarine Room, American Legion Post #3, Lincoln, Nebraska 1968
Tennessee Submarine Memorial, 1978
USS Amberjack Memorial, 1970
USS Argonaut Hall, 1967
USS Argonaut Memorial, 1964
USS Arizona Memorial Plaque, 1974
USS Balao Memorial
USS Barbel Memorial, 1960
USS Bullhead Memorial Park, 1979
USS Escolar Memorial, 1973
USS Flasher Memorial
USS Grayback Memorial, 1970
USS Grayling Memorial, 1976
USS Gudgeon Memorial, 1963
USS Herring Memorial, 1976
USS Herring Memorial Library, 1974
USS Nautilus Memorial, 1960
USS Parche Memorial
USS Quillback Memorial, 1974
USS R-12 Memorial, 1963
USS Runner/Grenadier Memorial, 1972
USS Scorpion Memorial
USS Sea Lion Memorial, 1974
USS Seawolf Memorial, 1967
USS Shark I Memorial, 1965
USS Squalus Memorial
USS Steelhead Memorial, 1960
USS Swordfish Memorial, 1965
USS Thresher Plaque
USS Trigger Memorial, 1977
USS Trout Memorial, 1962
USS Trout Memorial, Australia
USS Tullibee (SS-284) Mississippi Submarine Memorial, 2003
USS Wahoo Memorial, 1962
Vallejo Submarine Memorial
Vernon Palmer Wall Memorial

Organization
The organization is organized by Regions, States and Chapters.  Each Region has a Director and each State has a State Commander.  Chapters have their own organized structures with Presidents, Vice Presidents, etc. and are governed by By-laws.  Many states such as Texas and Florida have multiple chapters.

National Officers
The nationally elected officers are:
President
1st Vice President
2nd Vice President
Secretary-Treasurer
Recording Secretary
Historian
Public Affairs Officer
National Chaplains
Memorial Fund Director
Scholarship Fund Director
Polaris Editor

Executive Board
All officers, together  with the Immediate Past President, constitute the Executive Board of the organization which has general administrative powers.

State Commanders
Each state in the United States has at least one State Commander.

Regional Commanders
Every region in the United States has a Regional Director and Deputy Regional Director.

State Chapters
The organization is organized by State Chapters.  The respective State Commander is responsible for the day-to-day operation of their specific chapter in accordance with their base Bylaws.  At the height of its membership the organization had over 100 chapters.

National Office
The National Office is located in Rancho Murieta, California.

Submarine Library and Museum
Founded by Bernard A. Bastura the museum was located in Middletown, Connecticut.  On Labor Day 1966 the museum was officially dedicated to "perpetuate the memory of all the crewmen who lost their lives in WW II."   The collection has since been transferred to the Saint Marys Submarine Museum in Kings Bay, Georgia.

Membership
The organization currently has 3,661 members broken down into the following categories, minus Perpetual

Regular
Membership is restricted to officers and enlisted men of U.S. Navy submarine crews and U.S. Navy submarine relief crews who were on active duty between December 7, 1941 and December 31, 1946.

Charter members
Members having been accepted for membership prior to and including the closing day of the second National Convention 1956.

Honorary membership
Upon recommendation of the Executive Board and voting procedure set down in the By-Laws, any person who renders a notable service to the organization may be awarded an honorary membership for the life of the individual.

Life membership
Was only available to members past their 50th birthday.

Perpetual membership
All 3,505 American submariners still on eternal patrol as a result of submarine warfare in World War II were made Perpetual members.

Auxiliary Organizations
Wives of U.S. Submarine Veterans of World War II
Sons and Daughters of U.S. Submarine Veterans of World War II

Polaris magazine
Polaris was the official magazine of the organization and is no longer published.  The magazine received its name at the 1960 National Convention and was named after the North Star, the guiding point for the ancient mariners.  The publication contained news pertaining to the submarine veterans, the U.S. Navy, and the outside world.

National conventions
2015 - Pittsburgh, Pennsylvania
2014 - Burlingame, California
2013 - Rochester, Minnesota
2012 - Norfolk, Virginia
2011 - Springfield, Missouri
2010 - Covington, Kentucky
2009 - Green Bay, Wisconsin
2008 - Helena, Montana
2007 - Billings, Montana
2006 - Laughlin, Nevada
2005 - Salt Lake City, Utah
2004 - Houston, Texas
2003 - Reno, Nevada
2002 - Buffalo, New York
2001 - Saint Louis, Missouri
2000 - Phoenix, Arizona
1999 - Fort Worth, Texas
1998 - Albuquerque, New Mexico
1997 - Las Vegas, Nevada
1996 - Milwaukee, Wisconsin
1995 - Salt Lake City, Utah
1994 - Norfolk, Virginia
1993 - Los Angeles, California
1992 - Indianapolis, Indiana
1991 - San Antonio, Texas
1990 - Kissimmee, Florida
1989 - Sparks, Nevada
1988 - Milwaukee, Wisconsin
1987 - Little Rock, Arkansas
1986 - Baltimore, Maryland
1985 - Portland, Oregon
1984 - Chicago, Illinois
1983 - Scottsdale, Arizona
1982 - Hartford, Connecticut
1981 - Sacramento, California
1980 - Saint Louis, Missouri
1979 - Mobile, Alabama
1978 - Norfolk, Virginia
1977 - Seattle, Washington
1976 - Denver, Colorado
1975 - Nashville, Tennessee
1974 - Atlantic City, New Jersey
1973 - San Diego, California
1972 - Breezy Point, Minnesota
1971 - Houston, Texas
1970 - Hartford, Connecticut
1969 - Portland, Oregon
1968 - Cincinnati, Ohio
1967 - Omaha, Nebraska
1966 - New York City
1965 - Hawaii
1964 - San Francisco, California
1963 - Dallas, Texas
1962 - Chicago, Illinois
1961 - Philadelphia, Pennsylvania
1960 - San Diego, California
1959 - Denver, Colorado
1958 - Saint Louis, Missouri
1957 - New London, Connecticut
1956 - Atlantic City, New Jersey
1955 - Atlantic City, New Jersey

Organization closure
SVWWII reaffirmed their plan for a formal organizational closure in Norfolk, Virginia at the 2012 convention.  Local chapters will continue to function so long as there is an interest in doing so.

See also
United States Submarine Veterans Inc. (USSVI)

Submarine articles
 List of lost United States submarines
 Submarine warfare
 Submarines in the United States Navy
 List of submarine actions
 List of submarine museums

Notes

Books

External links
United States Submarine Veterans, Inc. website
On Eternal Patrol website
NavSource Naval History: Submarine Photo Archive website
U.S. Submarine Veterans of World War II : hearing before the Subcommittee on Administrative Law and Governmental Relations of the Committee on the Judiciary, House of Representatives, Ninety-seventh Congress, first session, on H.R. 894 ... June 11, 1981. 

American veterans' organizations
Patriotic and national organizations chartered by the United States Congress
Submarines of the United States